Michel Dumas (19 June 1812 – 26 June 1885) was a French painter, primarily of religious subjects.

Life and work 
Born in Lyon, he was a student of Claude Bonnefond and Jean-Michel Grobon at the École des Beaux-Arts de Lyon, a school where he would be a teacher himself, many years later.<ref>Charvet, "Les origines de l'enseignement public des arts et du dessin à Lyon", in Revue lyonnaise, Vol. XXXIII, pg.135, Archives historiques et statistiques du Rhône</ref> In 1834, he moved to Paris, where he worked in the studios of Jean-Auguste-Dominique Ingres at the École Nationale Supérieure des Beaux-Arts.

He then joined Ingres in Italy, spending sixteen years in Rome before returning to Paris, where he specialized in religious art. Later, he went back to Lyon, to take the position of Director at his old alma mater. He was named a Knight in the Legion of Honor in 1884. He died in Lyon in 1885.

His best known students include  and François Guiguet.

References

 Further reading 
 Georges Vigne and Marie-Hélène Lavallée, Les élèves d'Ingres '', exhibition catalog, Musée Ingres, 1999

External links 

More works by Dumas @ ArtNet

1812 births
1885 deaths
19th-century French painters
French emigrants to Italy
Religious artists
Artists from Lyon